On 20 July 1965 a Vickers Viscount of Cambrian Airways crashed on approach to Liverpool International Airport, after a flight from Ronaldsway Airport, Isle of Man. Both crew were killed, as well as two persons on the ground.

References 

Aviation accidents and incidents in 1965
Aviation accidents and incidents in England
1965 disasters in the United Kingdom
1965 in England
History of Liverpool
Accidents and incidents involving the Vickers Viscount
Airliner accidents and incidents in the United Kingdom
July 1965 events in the United Kingdom
1960s in Liverpool